Vinayagapuram is a residential neighbourhood in north Chennai, Tamil Nadu, South India.  Neighbourhoods close to Vinayagapuram are Perambur, Anna Nagar, Villivakkam, Puzhal, Jawahar Nagar, Thiru-vi-ka Nagar, Senthil Nagar, Madhavaram and Periyar Nagar. It is close to the Grand National Trunk Road.

Locations

Schools and colleges
 Velammal Matriculation School, Surapet
 Infant Jesus Matriculation School, near ECI church
 King's Matriculation School, Kalpalayam
 Velammal Engineering College, Surapet
 Godson school

Churches
Church of New Life in Jesus (CSI)
 ECI church
 Zion Garden AG Church

Places
Sri Kumaran Nagar
S.B.O.A. teachers colony
Saraswathy Nagar

Landmarks nearby
DRJ Hospital
Rettai Eri

References

External links
 Chennai Online website

Neighbourhoods in Chennai